Johannes Gmeinder (born 1976 in Konstanz) is a German clarinetist and academic.

Gmeinder studied clarinet at the Musikhochschule in Trossingen and Berlin. In 1996, he won a scholarship from the Orchesterakademie of the Berlin Philharmonic Orchestra. He has been the principal clarinetist of the Frankfurt Opera since 1999. In 2004, he became a professor at the Johannes Gutenberg University Mainz.

References

1976 births
German clarinetists
Academic staff of Johannes Gutenberg University Mainz
Living people
20th-century clarinetists
21st-century clarinetists